So Gay TV is a Canadian television talk show, which aired on PrideVision in the early 2000s. Hosted in its first season by Mathieu Chantelois and in its second season by Jason Ruta, the program originally aired in 2001 as an Internet television series connected to U8TV: The Lofters, and was picked up by PrideVision after that network's launch. The series ended in 2002 after the cancellation of The Lofters, although it continued to air in repeats on PrideVision.

So Gay TV mixed panel discussions and interviews with documentary and feature reports on lesbian, gay, bisexual and transgender issues and life in Canada. One of the show's most widely publicized segments was an interview with Hal Sparks, one of the stars of Queer as Folk, about his experience as a heterosexual actor playing a gay character.

The show was nominated for Best Talk Series at the 2002 Gemini Awards.

References

External links

OutTV (Canadian TV channel) original programming
2001 Canadian television series debuts
2002 Canadian television series endings
Canadian LGBT-related web series
2000s Canadian television talk shows
2000s Canadian LGBT-related television series
2001 web series debuts
2002 web series endings